The 2013 Uzbek League season was  the 22nd season of top level football in Uzbekistan since independence in 1992. Pakhtakor were the defending champions from the 2012 campaign.

Teams

Mash'al Mubarek and FK Andijan were relegated in the last edition of the Uzbek League to First League. Sogdiana Jizzakh and FK Guliston replaced them.

Managerial changes

Pre-season transfers

League table

Results

Season statistics

Top goalscorers

Last updated: 8 November 2013
Source: Soccerway

Awards

Monthly awards

References

External links
Championat.uz: Standings and Results

Uzbekistan Super League seasons
1
Uzbek
Uzbek